Peter Corlett OAM (born 1944) is an Australian sculptor, known for his full-figure sculptures cast in bronze, especially his memorial works.

Corlett studied sculpture at RMIT University, Melbourne, from 1961 to 1964. In 1975, he was awarded a special projects grant from the Visual Arts Board of the Australia Council. Between 1977 and 1980, he was artist in residence at Exeter University and Exeter College of Art in the United Kingdom.

Memorial works
In 1987, Corlett won a competition to create a memorial "to commemorate the courage and compassion" of John Simpson Kirkpatrick, a stretcher bearer during the Gallipoli Campaign in World War I. The result was a full size bronze sculpture, Simpson and his donkey, 1915, that now stands outside the Australian War Memorial in Canberra.

Cobbers is a full-size bronze sculpture created in 1998 for the Australian Memorial Park, near Fromelles in northern France. It depicts Sergeant Simon Fraser, a stretcher bearer with the 57th Battalion, rescuing a wounded compatriot from no man's land after the Battle of Fromelles (1916). The title comes from a letter that Fraser, a farmer from Byaduk, Victoria, wrote a few days after the battle and that was widely quoted in Australia's official history of World War I. In it, Fraser describes how one wounded soldier shouted out "Don't forget me, cobber." as he was helping another: Fraser went to get more stretcher bearers and both wounded soldiers were rescued. A replica of the sculpture is in the Shrine of Remembrance in Melbourne.

Corlett's other memorial works include:
The Bullecourt Digger
Memorial to the Australian Light Horse
Man in the mud
Sir Edward "Weary" Dunlop
They also served, (Two WRANS 1941–1985)
Edward 'Ted' Kenna VC

Other works
Corlett has also created several sculptures of famous people associated with his native Melbourne, such as John Farnham, Kylie Minogue and Dame Nellie Melba. Several of these can be seen at Waterfront City in the Melbourne Docklands. He also produced a bronze sculpture of a Kelpie for the Victorian town of Casterton.

References

External links

20th-century Australian sculptors
1944 births
Living people
21st-century Australian sculptors